Abo Greisha is a surname. Notable people with the surname include:

 Ali Abo Gresha (born 1947), Egyptian footballer
 Mohamed Mohsen Abo Gresha (born 1981), Egyptian footballer
 Mohamed Salah Abo Gresha (born 1970), Egyptian footballer